The Australian Masters is a chess tournament that has been held in Melbourne, Australia, annually since 1987. The tournament is an invitational event, normally run as a 10-player round-robin tournament. Since 2013 the tournament has become Australia's only round-robin Grandmaster tournament. A major sponsor of the tournament since its inception has been Eddy Levi (or his company Hallsten).

Winners 
1987 Darryl Johansen
1989 Stephen Solomon Guy West
1990 Stephen Solomon
1991 Stephen Solomon
1992 Tony Miles
1993 Michael Gluzman
1994 Leonid Sandler
1995 Tu Hoang Thong
1996 Nguyen Anh Dung
1997 Stephen Solomon
1998 Chris Depasquale
1999 Gary Lane
2000 Adam Hunt
2001 Guy West Darryl Johansen
2002 Guy West Michael Gluzman
2003 Stephen Solomon
2004 David Smerdon Darryl Johansen
2005 Jesse Noel Sales
2006 George Xie
2008 Vladimir Smirnov
2009 Stephen Solomon
2010 Stephen Solomon
2011 James Morris
2012 Anton Smirnov, Bobby Cheng, James Morris
2013 Normunds Miezis and Vasily Papin
2014 Vasily Papin, Rustam Khuznutdinov and Murtas Kazhgaleyev
2015 Kanan Izzat
2016 Anton Smirnov
2017 Vasily Papin, Adrien Demuth
2018 Anton Smirnov

IM and GM norms 
Since 2013, Grandmaster norms for performances above the 2600 level, have been available at the Australian Masters Championship thanks to the participation of foreign Grandmasters. International Master norms are also available at the Australian Masters tournament.

References 

 Ozbase - Australian Chess Games Archive

Chess competitions
Chess in Australia
Sports competitions in Melbourne
1987 in chess
Recurring sporting events established in 1987